The Standard & Poor's Commodity Index (SPCI) is a commodity price index that measures the price changes in a cross section of agricultural and industrial commodities with actively traded U.S. futures contracts, stretching across five sectors - Energy, Metals, Grains, Livestock, and Fibers & Softs. Only commodities that are consumed for industrial use are included in the index. Weights in the index are determined by the dollar value of Commercial Open Interest (COI) for each component commodity, and rebalanced annually each February. 

Effective January 31, 2008 Standard & Poor's discontinued calculation and publication of the S&P Commodity Index Series.

Components and weightings (as of 2006)
Natural Gas (17.66%)
Unleaded Gas (12.16%)
Heating Oil (12.13%)
Crude Oil (11.41%)
Wheat (5.15%)
Live Cattle (4.87%)
Corn (4.48%)
Coffee (3.88%)
Soybeans (3.84%)
Sugar (3.80%)
Silver (3.67%)
Copper (3.39%)
Cotton (3.22%)
Soybean Oil (2.98%)
Cocoa (2.79%)
Soybean Meal (2.57%)
Lean Hogs (2.04%)

Other Indices
Bloomberg Commodity Index (formerly known as Dow Jones–UBS Commodity Index, 2009-2014, formerly known as Dow Jones-AIG Commodity Index 1998-2009)
Goldman Sachs Commodity Index
Reuters/Jefferies CRB Index
Rogers International Commodity Index

External links
SP-GSCI Homepage

S&P Dow Jones Indices
Commodity price indices